KKYC (102.3 FM) was a radio station broadcasting a Classic rock/Rock format. Licensed to Clovis, New Mexico, US, the station serves the Clovis area. The station was last owned by Monte Spearman and Gentry Todd Spearman's High Plains Radio Network, through licensee HPRN Networks, LLP.

History
In May 2016, KKYC changed format from Classic Rock to an all Rock mix devised by Corporate Rock Program Director Matt Miller. The popular format offered the core Classic Rock favorites in addition to 2000s and current hits. Miller added a new vibe to the station with big-name artist interviews, un-duplicated on-air contesting and outside the box event and promotions. Miller left KKYC April 5, 2017.

The station went on the air as KWUA on June 18, 1992. On September 11, 1998, the station changed its callsign to KKYC.

HPRN Networks surrendered KKYC's license to the Federal Communications Commission on November 29, 2021, who cancelled it the same day.

References

External links
KKYC 102.3 The Wolf Facebook

KYC
Radio stations established in 1992
Radio stations disestablished in 2021
1992 establishments in New Mexico
2021 disestablishments in New Mexico
Clovis, New Mexico
Defunct radio stations in the United States
KYC